Pyrrosia is a genus of about 100 fern species in the polypod family, Polypodiaceae. Like other species in Polypodiaceae, the species of Pyrrosia are generally epiphytic on trees or rocks, a few species are terrestrial. The Latin name of Pyrrosia comes from the Greek pyrrhos (red), which refers to its leaves that are red due to the sporangia.

Species list
Pyrrosia abbreviata (Zoll. & Mor.) Hovenkamp
Pyrrosia adnascens (Sw.) Ching
Pyrrosia angustata (Sw.) Ching
Pyrrosia angustissima (Giesenh. ex Diels) Tagawa & K. Iwats.
Pyrrosia assimilis (Baker) Ching
Pyrrosia asterosora (Baker) Hovenkamp
Pyrrosia blepharolepis (C. Chr.) Ching
Pyrrosia boothii (Hook.) Ching
Pyrrosia borneensis (Copel.) K.H. Shing
Pyrrosia brassii (Copel.) Pic. Serm.
Pyrrosia christii (Giesenh.) Ching
Pyrrosia confluens (R. Br.) Ching
Pyrrosia costata (Wall. ex C. Presl) Tagawa & K. Iwats.
Pyrrosia dimorpha X.H. Guo & S.B. Zhou
Pyrrosia dispar (H. Christ) K.H. Shing
Pyrrosia distichocarpa (Mett.) K.H. Shing
Pyrrosia drakeana (Franch.) Ching
Pyrrosia eleagnifolia (Bory) Hovenkamp
Pyrrosia fengiana Ching
Pyrrosia flocculosa (D. Don) Ching
Pyrrosia foveolata (Alston) C.V. Morton
Pyrrosia fuohaiensis Ching & K.H. Shing
Pyrrosia gardneri (Mett.) Sledge
Pyrrosia hastata (Thunb.) Ching
Pyrrosia heterophylla (L.) M.G. Price
Pyrrosia intermedia (Goy) K.H. Shing
Pyrrosia laevis (J. Sm. ex Bedd.) Ching
Pyrrosia lanceolata (L.) Farw.
Pyrrosia liebuschii (Hieron.) Schelpe
Pyrrosia linearifolia (Hook.) Ching
Pyrrosia lingua (Thunb.) Farw.
Pyrrosia longifolia (Burm. f.) C.V. Morton
Pyrrosia macrocarpa (Copel.) K.H. Shing
Pyrrosia madagascariensis (C. Chr.) Schelpe
Pyrrosia mannii (Giesenh.) Ching
Pyrrosia matsudai (Hayata) Tagawa
Pyrrosia mechowii Alston
Pyrrosia micraster (Copel.) Tagawa
Pyrrosia mollis (Kunze) Ching
Pyrrosia novo-guineae (H. Christ) M.G. Price
Pyrrosia nummulariifolia (Sw.) Ching
Pyrrosia oblanceolata (C. Chr.) Tardieu
Pyrrosia obovata (Blume) Ching
Pyrrosia pannosa (Mett. ex Kuhn) Ching
Pyrrosia petiolosa (H. Christ) Ching
Pyrrosia piloselloides (L.) M.G. Price 
Pyrrosia polydactyla (Hance) Ching 	
Pyrrosia porosa (C. Presl) Hovenkamp 	
Pyrrosia princeps (Mett.) C.V. Morton 	
Pyrrosia pseudodrakeana K.H. Shing 	
Pyrrosia rasamalae (Racib.) K.H. Shing 	
Pyrrosia rhodesiana (C. Chr.) Schelpe
Pyrrosia rupestris Ching
Pyrrosia samarensis (C. Presl) Ching 	
Pyrrosia scolopendrina Ching 	
Pyrrosia sheareri (Baker) Ching 	
Pyrrosia shennongensis K.H. Shing 	
Pyrrosia similis Ching 	
Pyrrosia sphaerosticha (Mett.) Ching 	
Pyrrosia stigmosa (Sw.) Ching 	
Pyrrosia stolzii (Hieron.) Schelpe 	
Pyrrosia subfurfuracea (Hook.) Ching 	
Pyrrosia transmorrisonensis (Hayata) Ching 	
Pyrrosia tricholepis (Carr. ex Seemann) Ching

References

Pyrrosia
Epiphytes
Fern genera